The EuroLeague is the highest level tier and most important professional club competition between basketball teams in Europe, with teams from up to 18 different countries, from members of FIBA Europe, mostly consisting of teams from ULEB member national domestic leagues. The EuroLeague's records for individual players, coaches, and teams have been set over two different eras of the competition. The league's first era, when the competition was organized by FIBA, and the league's second era, organized by EuroLeague Basketball.

The FIBA era records of the competition were set from 1958 to 2001, including the lone season of the FIBA SuproLeague competition. While the EuroLeague Basketball era records of the competition have been set since 2000. There are also the overall historical records of the EuroLeague, which are the records for all formats and organizing bodies of the league's history, since 1958.

FIBA EuroLeague records (1958–2001)

Player records
The following records include only games played when the EuroLeague competition was under the control of FIBA, from the 1958 FIBA European Champions Cup season to the 2000–01 FIBA SuproLeague season. These records do not include any games played in the EuroLeague from the 2000–01 EuroLeague season to the present, since the competition has been controlled by the EuroLeague Basketball Company.

Game

 Most points scored in a game
 99 by  Radivoj Korać ( OKK Beograd), against Alviks on January 14, 1965

 Most total rebounds in a game
 30 by  Michalis Romanidis ( Aris Thessaloniki), against BV Den Helder on December 5, 1991
 30 by  John Pinone ( Estudiantes), against Aris Thessaloniki on November 7, 1991

 Most assists in a game
 17 by  Pedro Miguel ( S.L. Benfica), against CSKA Moscow on October 27, 1994
 17 by  Elmer Bennett ( Saski Baskonia), against Žalgiris Kaunas on December 10, 1998

 Most steals in a game
 11 by  Jimmy Nebot ( ASVEL Lyon), against Efes Istanbul on April 3, 1997
 11 by  Marcus Webb ( CSKA Moscow), against PAOK on January 8, 1998

 Most blocked shots in a game
 7 by  Hüseyin Beşok ( Efes Istanbul), against Plannja Luleå on January 4, 2001

 Most 3-point field goals made in a game
 10 by United States Andrew Goudelock (Turkey Fenerbahçe), against Bayern Munich on November 13, 2014 (10/13)
10 by Turkey Shane Larkin (Turkey Anadolu Efes), against Bayern Munich on November 29, 2019 (10/12)
 10 by  Carlos Lisboa ( S.L. Benfica), against Partizan on October 5, 1995

Season

Note: Average leaders only include players who played in at least 50% of the games in the season

 Most points scored
 661 by  Nikos Galis ( Aris), 1988–89

 Highest scoring average
 54.8 by  Radivoj Korać ( OKK Beograd), 1964–65

 Most total rebounds

 256 by  Stojko Vranković ( Panathinaikos), 1994–95

 Highest total rebounds per game average
 12.8 by  Roy Tarpley ( Olympiacos), 1993–94

 Most assists

 143 by  Vasily Karasev ( CSKA Moscow), 1995–96

 Highest assists per game average

 7.2 by  Vasily Karasev ( CSKA Moscow), 1995–96

 Most steals
 71 by  Riccardo Pittis ( Olimpia Milano), 1991–92

 Highest steals per game average
 3.7 by  Riccardo Pittis ( Olimpia Milano), 1991–92

 Most blocked shots
 47 by  Andrei Kirilenko ( CSKA Moscow), 2000–01

 Highest blocked shots per game average
 2.1 by  Andrei Kirilenko ( CSKA Moscow), 2000–01

Career

 Most games played
 205 by  Miki Berkovich

 Most points scored
 4,047 by  Nikos Galis

 Most points per game average
 43.6 by  Radivoj Korać

 Most steals
 256 by  Riccardo Pittis

EuroLeague Basketball records (2001–present)

Player records
The following records include only games played since the EuroLeague competition came under the control of the EuroLeague Basketball Company, starting with the 2000–01 EuroLeague season. These records do not include any games played in the EuroLeague from the 1958 FIBA European Champions Cup season to the 2000–01 FIBA SuproLeague season, when FIBA Europe controlled the competition.

Game

 Most PIR in a game
 63 by  Tanoka Beard ( Žalgiris Kaunas), against Skipper Bologna on January 22, 2004

 Most points scored in a game
 49 by  Shane Larkin ( Anadolu Efes), against Bayern Munich on November 29, 2019

 Most total rebounds in a game
 24 by  Antonis Fotsis ( Dynamo Moscow), against Benetton Basket on March 21, 2007

 Most offensive rebounds in a game
 16 by  Nikola Milutinov ( CSKA Moscow), against Olimpia Milano on December 30, 2020

 Most defensive rebounds in a game
 18 by  Donatas Motiejūnas ( Asseco Prokom), against Union Olimpija on December 7, 2011

 Most assists in a game
 19 by  Stefan Jović ( Crvena zvezda), against Bayern Munich on November 12, 2015
 19 by  Facu Campazzo ( Real Madrid), against ALBA Berlin on February 6, 2020

 Most steals in a game
 11 by  Jeff Trepagnier ( Ülker), against Partizan on January 26, 2006

 Most blocked shots in a game
 10 by  Stojko Vranković ( PAF Bologna), against Cibona on February 8, 2001

 Most turnovers in a game
 11 by  Sergei Bazarevich ( St. Petersburg Lions), against AEK Athens on December 13, 2000

 Most free throws made in a game
 18 by  Nikola Mirotić ( Real Madrid), against Žalgiris Kaunas on March 17, 2013 (18/18)

 Most free throws made in a game without a miss
 18 by  Nikola Mirotić ( Real Madrid), against Žalgiris Kaunas on March 17, 2013

 Most free throws attempted in a game
 21 by  Bobby Brown ( Montepaschi Siena), against Fenerbahçe on November 2, 2012 (16/21)

 Most 2-point field goals made in a game
 18 by  Kaspars Kambala ( Efes Pilsen), against FC Barcelona on October 30, 2002 (18/28)

 Most 2-point field goals made in a game without a miss
 11 by  Gustavo Ayón ( Real Madrid), against Fenerbahçe on May 19, 2019

 Most 2-point field goals attempted in a game
 28 by  Kaspars Kambala ( Efes Pilsen), against FC Barcelona on October 30, 2002 (18/28)

 Most 3-point field goals made in a game
 10 by  Andrew Goudelock ( Fenerbahçe), against Bayern Munich on November 13, 2014 (10/13)
 10 by  Shane Larkin ( Anadolu Efes), against Bayern Munich on November 29, 2019 (10/12)
 10 by  Shane Larkin ( Anadolu Efes), against Olympiacos on March 6, 2020 (10/15)

 Most 3-point field goals made in a game without a miss
 9 by  Saulius Štombergas ( Tau Ceramica), against AEK Athens on April 4, 2001

 Most 3-point field goals attempted in a game
 21 by  Alexey Shved ( Khimki), against Olympiacos on December 18, 2019 (7/21)

Season

Note: Average leaders only include players who played in at least 51% of the games in the season

 Most minutes played
 1,138 by  Brad Wanamaker ( Darüşşafaka), 2016–2017

 Most minutes per game
 38.35 by  Derrick Hamilton ( Spartak Saint Petersburg), 2000–01

 Most PIR
 711 by  Luka Dončić ( Real Madrid), 2017–18

 Highest PIR per game average
 30.92 by  Dejan Tomašević ( Budućnost), 2000–01

 Most points scored
 740 by  Alexey Shved ( Khimki), 2017–18

 Highest scoring average
 26.0 by  Alphonso Ford ( Peristeri), 2000–01

 Most total rebounds
 282 by  Vincent Poirier ( Baskonia), 2018–19

 Highest total rebounds per game average
 12.8 by  Mirsad Türkcan ( CSKA Moscow), 2001–02

 Most offensive rebounds
 117 by  Vincent Poirier ( Baskonia), 2018–19

 Highest offensive rebounds per game average
 5.0 by  Dejan Tomašević ( Budućnost), 2000–01

 Most defensive rebounds
 202 by  Ioannis Bourousis ( Baskonia), 2015–16

 Highest defensive rebounds per game average
 8.95 by  Mirsad Türkcan ( Montepaschi Siena), 2002–03

 Most assists
 286 by  Nick Calathes ( Panathinaikos), 2018–19

 Highest assists per game average
 9.11 by  Nick Calathes ( Panathinaikos), 2019–20

 Most steals
 64 by  Manu Ginóbili ( Kinder Bologna), 2000–01

 Highest steals per game average
 3.7 by  Jemeil Rich ( Lugano Snakes), 2000–01
 3.7 by  Ivica Marić ( Zadar), 2000–01

 Most blocked shots
 68 by  Ekpe Udoh ( Fenerbahçe), 2016–17

 Highest blocked shots per game average
 3.21 by  Grigorij Khizhnyak ( Žalgiris Kaunas), 2001–02

 Most free throws made
 168 by  Keith Langford ( UNICS Kazan), 2016–17

 Most free throws attempted
 202 by  Keith Langford ( UNICS Kazan), 2016–17

 Highest free throw percentage
 97.22% by  Marcelinho Huertas ( FC Barcelona), 2012–13

 Most field goals made
 239 by  Alexey Shved ( Khimki), 2017–18

 Most field goals attempted
 587 by  Alexey Shved ( Khimki), 2017–18

 Highest field goal percentage
 80.49% by  Giannis Giannoulis ( Panathinaikos), 2001–02

 Most 2-point field goals made
 176 by  Brandon Davies ( Žalgiris), 2018–19

 Most 2-point field goals attempted
 315 by  Brandon Davies ( Žalgiris), 2018–19

 Highest 2-point field goal percentage
 82.5% by  Giannis Giannoulis ( Panathinaikos), 2001–02
 82.5% by  Terence Morris ( FC Barcelona), 2009–10

 Most 3-point field goals made
 107 by  Alexey Shved ( Khimki), 2017–18

 Most 3-point field goals attempted
 324 by  Alexey Shved ( Khimki), 2017–18

 Highest 3-point field goal percentage
 60.0% by  Paweł Wiekiera ( Śląsk Wrocław), 2002–03

Career

Note: Average leaders only include players that played in at least 31 EuroLeague games over their career

 Most games played
 392 by   Paulius Jankūnas

 Most games started
 274 by   Paulius Jankūnas

 Most minutes played
 9,028 by  Vassilis Spanoulis

 Most minutes per game
 35.0 by  Anthony Parker

 Most PIR
 4,100 by  Vassilis Spanoulis

 Most PIR per game average
 21.41 by  Anthony Parker

 Most points scored
 4,335 by  Vassilis Spanoulis

 Most points per game average
 22.22 by  Alphonso Ford

 Most seasons leading league in points per game average
 2 by  Alphonso Ford
 2 by  Igor Rakočević

 Most total rebounds
 2,010 by  Paulius Jankūnas

 Most total rebounds per game average
 10.1 by  Joseph Blair

 Most seasons leading league in rebounds per game average
 5 by  Mirsad Türkcan

 Most offensive rebounds
 702 by  Felipe Reyes

 Most offensive rebounds per game average
 3.4 by  Tanoka Beard

 Most defensive rebounds
 1,337 by   Paulius Jankūnas

 Most defensive rebounds per game average
 6.99 by  Mirsad Türkcan

 Most assists
 1,558 by  Vassilis Spanoulis

 Most assists per game average
 5.97 by  Nick Calathes

 Most seasons leading league in assists per game average
3 by  Nick Calathes

 Most steals
 434 by  Dimitris Diamantidis

 Most steals per game average
 2.77 by  Manu Ginóbili

 Most seasons leading league in steals per game average
 3 by  Nick Calathes

 Most blocked shots
 255 by  Bryant Dunston

 Most blocked shots per game average
 3.19 by  Grigorij Khizhnyak

 Most seasons leading league in blocked shots per game average
 2 by  Grigorij Khizhnyak
 2 by  Ekpe Udoh
 2 by  Bryant Dunston
 2 by  Edy Tavares

 Most free throws made
 1,113 by  Vassilis Spanoulis

 Most free throws attempted
 1,422 by  Vassilis Spanoulis

 Highest free throw percentage
 94.0% by  Nando de Colo

 Most 2-point field goals made
 1,137 by  Ante Tomić

 Most 2-point field goals attempted
 2,054 by  Georgios Printezis

 Highest 2-point field goals percentage
 72.35% by  Edy Tavares

 Most 3-point field goals made
 623 by  Juan Carlos Navarro

 Most 3-point field goals attempted
 1,669 by  Juan Carlos Navarro

 Highest 3-point field goals percentage
 50.45% by  Fran Pilepić

FIBA EuroLeague & EuroLeague Basketball records (1958–present)

Player records
The following records include all of the games played under all of the league's formats, since the EuroLeague competition was first created, starting with the 1958 FIBA European Champions Cup season.

Career

Note: Average leaders only include players that played in at least 31 EuroLeague games over their career

 Most games played
 392 by  Paulius Jankūnas

 Most games started
 274 by   Paulius Jankūnas

 Most minutes played
 9,028 by  Vassilis Spanoulis

 Most PIR
 4,100 by  Vassilis Spanoulis

 Most points scored
 4,335 by  Vassilis Spanoulis

 Most points per game average
 32.4 by  Nikos Galis

 Most total rebounds
 2,010 by  Paulius Jankūnas

 Most seasons leading league in rebounds per game average
 5 by  Mirsad Türkcan

 Most assists
 1,558 by  Vassilis Spanoulis

 Most seasons leading league in assists per game average
3 by  Nick Calathes

 Most steals
 452 by  Dimitris Diamantidis

 Most seasons leading league in steals per game average
 4 by  Riccardo Pittis

 Most blocked shots
 255 by  Bryant Dunston

 Most blocked shots per game average
 2.22 by  Ekpe Udoh

 Most seasons leading league in blocked shots per game average
 2 by  Grigorij Khizhnyak
 2 by  Ekpe Udoh
 2 by  Bryant Dunston
 2 by  Edy Tavares

 Most 3-point field goals made
 623 by  Juan Carlos Navarro

 Most 3-point field goals attempted
 1,711 by  Juan Carlos Navarro

Awards

Since the 1958 EuroLeague season:

 Most EuroLeague MVP Awards
 2 by  Anthony Parker

 Most EuroLeague Final Four MVP Awards
 3 by  Toni Kukoč
 3 by  Vassilis Spanoulis

 Most EuroLeague Finals Top Scorer Awards
 3 by  Jānis Krūmiņš
 3 by  Sergei Belov

 Most All-EuroLeague First Team honors
 5 by  Juan Carlos Navarro

 Most FIBA European Selection / FIBA EuroStar / All-EuroLeague Team honors
 8 by  Vassilis Spanoulis

 Most EuroLeague MVP of the Month Awards
 4 by  Nikola Mirotić

 Most EuroLeague MVP of the Round Awards
 16 by  Nando de Colo

 Most Alphonso Ford Trophies
 3 by  Igor Rakočević

 Most EuroLeague Rising Star awards
 2 by  Nikola Mirotić
 2 by  Bogdan Bogdanović 
 2 by  Luka Dončić

 Most EuroLeague Best Defender awards
 6 by  Dimitris Diamantidis

 Most EuroLeague Coach of the Year awards
 3 by  Željko Obradović

Team records
Since the 2000–01 EuroLeague season:

Game
 Most PIR
 175 –  Maccabi Tel Aviv against  Scavolini Pesaro on November 25, 2004

 Fewest PIR
 (-2) –  Montepaschi Siena against  Olympiacos on March 22, 2011

 Most points
 123 –  Maccabi Tel Aviv against  Scavolini Pesaro on November 25, 2004
 123 –  Panathinaikos against  Chorale Roanne on November 21, 2007

 Most points in a half
 70 –  Real Madrid against  Ovarense on December 20, 2000

 Most points in 1st half
 65 –  Nizhny Novgorod against  Anadolu Efes on January 23, 2015

 Most points in 2nd half
 70 –  Real Madrid against  Ovarense on December 20, 2000

 Most points in a quarter
 43 –  Maccabi Tel Aviv against  Montepaschi Siena on March 4, 2010

 Most combined points – overtime
 232 –  Skipper Bologna (114) against  Panathinaikos (118) in 2 overtimes on January 14, 2004

 Most combined points – regulation
 224 –  Skipper Bologna (117) against  Žalgiris Kaunas (107) on January 22, 2004

 Fewest points
 35 –  KK Krka against  CSKA Moscow on November 19, 2003

 Fewest points in a quarter 
 2 –  Benetton Basket against  Efes Pilsen on March 10, 2005
 2 –  Maroussi against  KK Partizan on February 11, 2011
 2 –  Žalgiris Kaunas against  Anadolu Efes on December 4, 2014

 Fewest points in a half
 9 –  Montepaschi Siena against  Olympiacos on March 22, 2011

 Fewest points after 3 quarters
 22 –  Montepaschi Siena against  Olympiacos on March 22, 2011

 Largest margin of victory
 63 –  Montepaschi Siena (112) against  KK Budućnost (49) on February 13, 2003

 Largest margin at half-time
 38 –  Olympiacos (47) against  Montepaschi Siena (9) on March 22, 2011

 Most field goals made
 46 –  Real Madrid against  KK Zadar on January 10, 2002

 Most field goals attempted
 91 –  Virtus Bologna against  London Towers on February 7, 2002

 Best field goals percentage
 77.78 % –  Laboral Kutxa against  AJ Milano on February 25, 2009

 Most 3-point field goals made
 22 –  Anadolu Efes S.K. against  Maccabi Tel Aviv B.C. on February 24, 2022

 Most 3-point field goals attempted
 45 –  Montepaschi Siena against  Maccabi Tel Aviv on May 2, 2008

 Best 3-point field goals percentage
 84.62 % –  FC Barcelona against  Cibona on February 5, 2003

 Most Rebounds
 62 –  Asseco Prokom against  Montepaschi Siena on December 13, 2012

 Most Offensive Rebounds
 30 –  CSKA Moscow against  Olimpia Milano on December 30, 2020

 Most Defensive Rebounds
 43 –  Asseco Prokom against  Unicaja on February 3, 2010

 Most Assists
 33 –  Real Madrid against  Nizhny Novgorod on October 30, 2014
 33 –  Real Madrid against  Dinamo Sassari on November 5, 2014

 Most Steals
 33 –  Virtus Bologna against  Adecco Estudiantes on February 1, 2001

 Most Blocks
 12 –  Žalgiris Kaunas against  Adecco Estudiantes on December 14, 2000
 12 –  Žalgiris Kaunas against  Asseco Prokom on December 18, 2008

 Most Turnovers
 35 –  Unicaja against  DKV Joventut on December 20, 2006

 Fewest Turnovers
 2 –  Real Madrid against  CSKA Moscow on March 20, 2014

 Most Fouls Committed
 41 –  Skipper Bologna against  Panathinaikos on January 14, 2004

Season
 Best Record
 20–2 –  FC Barcelona, 2009–10

 Worst Record
 0–14 –  London Towers, 2001–02

 Worst Record, qualified to top 16
 2–8 –  Asseco Prokom, 2008–09

 Longest winning streak
 18 –  CSKA Moscow, 2006–07

 Longest winning streak from season start
 17 –  CSKA Moscow, 2004–05

 Longest losing streak
 17 –  Khimki, 2020–21

 Most PIR per game
 111.92 –  Maccabi Tel Aviv, 2004–05

 Fewest PIR per game
 42.29 –  London Towers, 2001–02

 Most points per game
 92.04 –  Maccabi Tel Aviv, 2004–05

 Fewest points per game
 58.90 –  Union Olimpija, 2011–12

 Most assists per game
 19.13 –  Khimki Moscow, 2012–13

 Most steals per game
 17.10 –  Lugano Snakes, 2000–01

 Most blocks per game
 5.58 –  Žalgiris Kaunas, 2000–01

 Most turnovers per game
 20.50 –  Ovarense, 2000–01

 Fewest turnovers per game
 9.85 –  Galatasaray, 2013–14

 Highest free throw percentage
 82.64 % –  KK Zagreb, 2011–12

 Highest 2-point field goals percentage
 59.18 % –  Real Madrid, 2001–02

 Highest 3-point field goals percentage
 45.38 % –  KK Partizan, 2001–02

References

External links
Official Euroleague statistics page

EuroLeague statistics